Remote Control Records was established in 2001 by Steve Cross and Harvey Saward. It provides publicity, label management, distribution and marketing services to international and local artists and labels.

Remote Control's roster of international artists includes Adele, Queens of the Stone Age, The xx, FKA Twigs, Jungle, Vampire Weekend, Alabama Shakes, Radiohead, the National, Purity Ring and SBTRKT. The company represents various international record labels in the Australian and New Zealand markets, including 4AD, Matador Records, Rough Trade, True Panther, XL Recordings, and Young Turks. By October 2009 Andrew McMillen of Mess+Noise felt, "[it] represents a substantial roster of international artists in Australia and New Zealand."

In 2004 Remote Control established Dot Dash Recordings with Inertia Distribution, exclusively for Australian acts. The Dot Dash roster includes Pearls, Teeth & Tongue, Client Liaison, Sunbeam Sound Machine, Total Giovanni, Dorsal Fins, Saskwatch, Jeremy Neale, Methyl Ethel, and Velociraptor.

Remote Control also works in partnership with a number of independent Australian and New Zealand labels, including Milk!, Flightless and Barely Dressed, providing support to such artists as Courtney Barnett, King Gizzard & the Lizard Wizard, Fat Freddy's Drop, Babe Rainbow, Kllo, and Banoffee.

In 2013 Remote Control opened a new publicity and promotions department via Recon Music, an established, boutique PR agency specialising in strategic national media campaigns. Recon's list of past and present clients included Sharon Van Etten, Ty Segall, Josh Pyke, The Clean, Elizabeth Rose, Allday, DZ Deathrays, Say Lou Lou, Loon Lake, Sally Seltmann, Sugar Mountain Festival, Saskwatch and Philadelphia Grand Jury.

The label celebrated its 15th birthday in June 2016 by a party with, "a wide range of dope beat pushers, from Jim Lawrie at the start to Teeth & Tongue in the middle to Milwaukee Banks at the end."

theMusic.com.aus reviewers described the company in February 2018, "one of the country’s leading record labels." They observed, "they’ve opened up a completely different avenue of upcoming talent and assisted in building strong communities within the local scene" and determined that, "2017 saw the label have its strongest and most consistent year ever on the ARIA Album Chart."

Representation

Labels

Beggars Group
4AD
Matador Records
Rough Trade
True Panther
XL Recordings
Young Turks
Dot Dash Recordings
Flightless
Barely Dressed Records
Omnian Music Group
2MR
Body Double Ltd
Captured Tracks
Couple Skate
Fantasy Memory
Honor Press
Manufactured Recordings
Sinderlyn
Squirrel Thing

International acts
 

AC Newman
Adam Green
Adele
Alabama Shakes
Alexander
Algiers
Atlas Sound
Atoms For Peace
BeeGeeDee
Belle & Sebastian
Basement Jaxx
Bauhaus
Beirut
Benjamin Booker
The Big Pink
Blonde Redhead
Body/Head
Boulevards
The Breeders
British Sea Power
Ceremony
Camera Obscura
Cat Power
Civil Civic
The Cave Singers
The Cocteau Twins
The Creases
The Cult
Daughter
Delorean
Deerhunter
DIIV
Dillinger Escape Plan
East India Youth
Efterklang
Eddi Reader
EMA
Emiliana Torrini
Elvis Perkins
Esben & the Witch
Eyedress
Fat Freddy's Drop
FKA Twigs
Francoiz Breut
Friendly Fires
Fucked Up
Future Islands
Future of the Left
Gang Gang Dance
Giggs
Glasser
Grayson Gilmour
Guerre
Holy Fuck
The Horrors
Houndmouth
Iceage
Inc
Indians
Holly Herndon
Howler
Ibeyi
Iron & Wine
Jamie xx
Jane Badler
Jeffrey Lewis
Jenny Lewis
Jungle
Kelly Dance
King Krule
Kirin J Callinan
Kurt Vile
Lapsley
Lee Ranaldo & the Dust
Le1f
Lo Fang
 Love Migrate
Lower
Lucianblomkamp
Majical Cloudz
Merchandise
Micachu
Mike Turner
 The Mountain Goats
The National
 Ned Collette
New Gods
The New Pornographers
Palma Violets
Panthu Du Prince
Parquet Courts
Pavement
Paul Banks
Peaches
Pixies
Prodigy
Purity Ring
QT
Queens of the Stone Age
 Radiohead
Ratking
Ratatat
SOAK
 Sagamore
Sampha
Savages
SBTRKT
Scott Walker
Shamir
SHLOHMO
Sigur Ros
SOAK
Sohn
 Sonic Youth
St. Vincent
Stereolab
Stornoway
Super Wild Horses
T54
Thom Yorke
Thurston Moore
Tindersticks
Tobias Jesso Jr.
Tune-Yards
Twin Shadow
 Vampire Weekend
 Velociraptor
Warpaint
Wild Nothing
The White Stripes
Willis Earl Beal
Woods
Yo La Tengo
The xx
Zomby

Australian acts

Banoffee
Client Liaison
Courtney Barnett
Dirty Three
Dorsal Fins
Jess Ribeiro
 Jim Lawrie
King Gizzard & the Lizard Wizard
Leah Senior
Love Migrate
Miami Horror
Milwaukee Banks
Methyl Ethel
The Murlocs
Oh Pep!
Pearls
Pipe-Eye
Saskwatch
Sui Zhen
Sunbeam Sound Machine
Teeth & Tongue
Velociraptor

See also

 List of record labels

References

External links
 
 "Remote Control" record label credits at AllMusic
 

Australian record labels
Record labels established in 2001
Alternative rock record labels
Indie rock record labels
Record labels based in Melbourne